RewardsCentral (formerly EmailCash Marketing, formerly TEMPNAME) is an Australian website run by PermissionCorp,
with branches for residents of Australia, Taiwan, 
New Zealand (SmileCity) 
and United Kingdom (Rewards Central). The company was founded by Bob Cheng in Sydney, Australia in 1999. EmailCash was ranked 40th in the Business Review Weekly's Fast 100 index for 2004.

Operation
The company is based on a reward program, the company rewards members with points when they perform certain tasks. These include participation in market research surveys, completion of promotional offers, a daily 'Quick Survey' and visiting specified websites.

Survey Rewards
At the beginning of 2012, the Australian website claimed 200,000,000 points ($2 million) and $40,000 in competition prizes were paid out to members annually for completed surveys. While unable to confirm the number of points awarded to members each year, it was observed and reported in Rewards Central own website that less than $40,000 was paid out annually in the past two years. In 2011, the quarterly $10,000 competition was only drawn twice, once in March and once in October. A third draw was originally scheduled in June 2011, delayed to July 2011 and eventually cancelled with no explanation to members other than the competition being termed "over" and entries for the competition carrying over to the October draw. Competition winners as shown on Rewards Central Website show only three winners of the $10,000 competition in 2010. In 2012 the first $10,000 draw occurred in January with the next draw not scheduled until July.

At the end of May 2012 Rewards Central altered the cash paid out for the competition to $20,000 a year, halving the benefit for screened out surveys for its members. In an effort to make this alteration appear the equivalent of other survey sites the alteration also changed the expected pay-outs on competitors sites which have not occurred. This alteration still has not explained the underpayment of benefits to members of previous years.

Notes

External links
 RewardsCentral
 Agentur Berlin
 Hdwh
 Free Voucher Guide

Technology companies of Australia
Online companies of Australia
Reward websites